NGC 953 (also PGC 9586, UGC 1991, MCG 5-7-1, GWT GWT 504 104 or 505.1) is an elliptical galaxy in the constellation Triangulum. It has an apparent magnitude of 14.5.
It was discovered by the German astronomer Heinrich Louis d'Arrest on September 26, 1865.

References

NGC 0953
NGC 0953
0953
01991
09586
18650926